KXIT (1240 AM) is a radio station licensed to serve Dalhart, Texas.  The station is owned by Rogco Family, I, LLC. It recently changed from airing a country music format to a variety of 1960s, 1970s, and 1980s classic rock. The station was assigned the KXIT call letters by the Federal Communications Commission.

Specialty programming includes: Retro 80's with Jesse Torres on Mondays; Hair Bands with Jesse Torres on Wednesday; 70s rock classics and album rock with Ashley Brownlow on Thursdays; and country music with Rob Randall on Saturday morning.  Radio Dalhart President George Chambers also hosts a Friday Oldies show.

KXIT broadcasts from local schools to support the kids. Programs aired are UIL, Halloween stories, Pep Rallies, Open House and many other programs. KXIT also broadcasts throughout the year special events: Veterans Day parade, XIT Rodeo Reunion, Elks dances, Dalhart Fire Department annual fundraiser, XIT Rangers and many more events.

References

External links
KXIT official website

XIT
Radio stations established in 1946
Dallam County, Texas
1946 establishments in Texas